Evgeniya Ivanova may refer to:

 Evgeniya Ivanova (Russian water polo) (born 1987), Russian water polo player
 Evgeniya Ivanova (Uzbekistani water polo) (born 1991), Uzbekistani water polo player